Sira may refer to:

Languages
 Sira languages, a clade of Bantu languages
 Sira language, a Bantu language of Gabon

Places

Czech Republic
 Sirá, a municipality and village

India 
 Province of Sira, a historical Mughal province in southern India
 Sira, India, a city in Tumkur district of Karnataka, India
 Sira Taluk, whose headquarters are in Sira

Iran 
 Sira, Iran, a village in Alborz Province, Iran

Norway 
 Sira, Norway, a village in Flekkefjord municipality, Agder county
 Sira River, a river running through the Sirdalen valley in Agder and Rogaland counties

Religion
 Sīra, prophetic biography in Islam
 Sīra shaʿbiyya, popular epic in Arabic
 Sira Church (Nesset), a parish church in Møre og Romsdal county, Norway
 Sirat Rasul Allah, the traditional name for biographies of the Islamic Prophet Muhammad 
 Sira, title in Old West Norse for a priest

Other uses
 Sira (notified body), engineering companies based in South London
 Sira Fortress, Aden, Yemen
 Şıra, a Turkish drink
 SirA or Uroporphyrinogen-III C-methyltransferase, an enzyme

See also
 Sirah (disambiguation)
 Sirat (disambiguation)
 Sura (disambiguation)
 Syrah, or Shiraz grape, used to produce red wine